The Civilian Resistance Medal was a war service medal of the Kingdom of Belgium established by royal decree on 21 March 1951 and awarded to all members of the Belgian civilian resistance during the Second World War who were recognised as such by the law of 24 September 1946.

Award description
The Civilian Resistance Medal is a circular 39mm in diameter bronze medal.  Its obverse bears the relief image of the torso of a man breaking free of chains around his wrists, a woman stands behind him and slightly to his left.  The reverse bears the relief inscription in Latin "RESTITERUNT" meaning "THEY RESISTED" with the years "1940" above and "1945" below.  The reverse has a slightly raised border.

The medal is suspended by a ring through a suspension loop from a 37 mm wide light green silk moiré ribbon with two central 1 mm wide red stripes 5 mm apart and 4 mm black edge stripes. The colours of the ribbon are symbolic, the black denoting the dark days of the German occupation and/or the clandestine nature of the resistance, the green stands for the hope of liberation and the red for the spilled blood of the resistance members.

Notable recipients (partial list)
Baron Charles Poswick

See also

Resistance during World War II
Resistance movement
 List of Orders, Decorations and Medals of the Kingdom of Belgium

References

Other sources
 Quinot H., 1950, Recueil illustré des décorations belges et congolaises, 4e Edition. (Hasselt)
 Cornet R., 1982, Recueil des dispositions légales et réglementaires régissant les ordres nationaux belges. 2e Ed. N.pl.,  (Brussels)
 Borné A.C., 1985, Distinctions honorifiques de la Belgique, 1830–1985 (Brussels)

External links
Bibliothèque royale de Belgique (In French)
Les Ordres Nationaux Belges (In French)
ARS MORIENDI Notables from Belgian history (In French and Dutch)

Orders, decorations, and medals of Belgium
Awards established in 1951
1951 establishments in Belgium